Don't Worry About Me is the debut album released by Joey Ramone as a solo artist. It was released posthumously on February 19, 2002, by Sanctuary Records, less than a year after his death.  The album was produced by Daniel Rey, who also did most of the guitar work.  Rey had previously produced three of the Ramones' albums, between 1987 and 1995.

The album includes two covers: "What a Wonderful World," originally performed by Louis Armstrong, and "1969," originally performed by the Stooges. "What a Wonderful World" was used for the ending credits of Michael Moore's film Bowling for Columbine. It also appeared on the soundtrack to Freaky Friday.

A DualDisc version of the album was released on November 19, 2002. It included the album in the DVD-Audio format, which is in 5.1 surround sound, as well as the music video for "What a Wonderful World" (directed by Debbie Harry) and other material.

Don't Worry About Me peaked at #21 on the Billboard 200.

Critical reception
The Austin Chronicle wrote that "though Ramones neophytes would be best served by starting at the beginning, Don't Worry About Me is a must for card-carrying superfans." Entertainment Weekly called the album "a testament to the uplifting power of rock." Now wrote that it "boasts better songwriting and playing than the last few Ramones albums, with Joey singing strong, free of any ironic or goofy pose." Wired wrote that "pointless guitar solos are evident on several tracks, but Joey's goofy teenage romanticism still manages to carry the day."

Track listing

Personnel 
Credits adapted from the album's liner notes.

Technical
Daniel Rey – producer, engineer, mixing 
Jon Marshall Smith – engineer, mixing 
Joe Blaney – mixing ("Don't Worry About Me")
Noah Simon – assistant mixing engineer ("Don't Worry About Me")
Howie Weinberg – mastering
George Seminara – front cover photography
George DuBose – package design
Charlotte Lesher – executive producer
Mickey Leigh – executive producer

References

2002 debut albums
Joey Ramone albums
Sanctuary Records albums
Albums published posthumously
Albums produced by Daniel Rey